The Stourport Ring is a connected series of canals forming a circuit, or canal ring, around Worcestershire, The Black Country and Birmingham in The Midlands, England. The ring is formed from the River Severn, the Staffordshire and Worcestershire Canal, the Stourbridge Canal, the Dudley Canals, the Birmingham Canal Navigations (Netherton Tunnel Branch Canal and Birmingham New Main Line) and the Worcester and Birmingham Canal.

The ring is 74 miles and includes 105 locks including 3 electrically operated river locks, 2 pairs of staircase locks and 2 broad locks. The route includes flights of locks at Tardebigge (x30), Stourbridge (x16) and the Black Delph at Brierley Hill (x8). The route also includes two of the longest navigable tunnels on the UK network, these being the Netherton and Wast Hills Tunnels.

The ring has an alternative longer route via Wolverhampton of 83 miles and 122 locks and does not include the Stourbridge or Dudley canals. This route uses the connection between the Staffordshire and Worcestershire Canal, and the BCN Main Line at Aldersley Junction.

The ring is popular for cruising and has a number of narrowboat hire centres on the route including Alvechurch, Viking Afloat (Worcester), Anglo-Welsh (Tardebigge), Brook Line (Dunhampstead) and Black Prince (Stoke Prior).

Popular visitor attractions on or close to the Stourport Ring include Cadbury World, The Black Country Living Museum, the Severn Valley Railway, Kinver Edge, the Birmingham Jewellery Quarter, Brindleyplace plus the Merry Hill, Bullring and Mailbox shopping centres.

Popular overnight mooring places on the ring include Worcester city centre, Stourport Basin, Wolverley, Kinver, Merry Hill, Windmill End, The Black Country Museum (via short detour), Gas Street Basin, Hopwood, Stoke Works and Dunhampstead.

List of all locks on the ring with their map references
Based on travelling clockwise and starting at Worcester. Excludes the northern extension.

 From Blowers Green to Tardebigge top lock, the ring is at the Birmingham Level for 27 miles.

Navigability

During spring freshet the Severn can be closed to navigation, making the ring not fully navigable.  There is also potential for some sections of the ring being temporarily unnavigable consequent to lack of water during a drought.

See also

 Canals of the United Kingdom
 Canal ring
 River Severn

References
 Pearson's Guide to the Stourport Ring & the BCN 6th Edition

External links
   BW Stourport Ring guide
 Timelapse video from a boat ascending the Tardebigge lock Flight

Canals in England
Canal rings in the United Kingdom
Transport in Dudley
Lists of coordinates
Transport in Birmingham, West Midlands
Transport in Wolverhampton